Joesjö (or Jovattnet) is a Swedish village which lies about 30 km from Tärnaby and Hemavan.  To get there from Tärnaby one takes the E12 (Blue Road) west. After 10 km one turns off towards Joesjö and Hattfjelldal (on Krutfjällsvägen, road 1116.  From there it is 25 km to Joesjö.

In Joesjö there is, amongst other things, the food store Tärna Vilt AB. Joesjö was previously (up to the 1950s) a centre for trade between people from Midt-Helgeland on the Norwegian border and their neighbouring Swedes.  From Joesjö it is barely 20 km to the nearest Norwegian hamlet.

Ingemar Stenmark, an Alpine skier, was born here.

Populated places in Västerbotten County